Candor or candour may refer to:

 Candor or parrhesia, the quality of speaking candidly in rhetoric
 Candour (magazine), a British far-right magazine
 "Candour", a song by Neck Deep from their 2014 album Wishful Thinking
 Duty of candour, a concept in British law
 Candor, a 2009 speculative fiction novel by Pam Bachorz
 Candor (company), a financial technology company

Towns 
 Candor, New York, a town.
 Candor (village), New York, a village within the town.
 Candor, North Carolina.
 Candor, Oise, France.

See also
Candor, one of the five factions in the Divergent series by Veronica Roth
Kandor (disambiguation)